Anupam Kher is an Indian actor and the former Chairman of Film and Television Institute of India. He is the recipient of two National Film Awards and eight Filmfare Awards. He has appeared in over 500 films in several languages and many plays. He won the Filmfare Award for Best Actor for his performance in Saaransh (1984). He holds the record for winning the Filmfare Award for Best Comedian five times in total for: Ram Lakhan (1989), Lamhe (1991),  Khel (1992), Darr (1993) and Dilwale Dulhaniya Le Jayenge (1995). He won the National Film Award for Special Mention twice for his performances in Daddy (1989) and Maine Gandhi Ko Nahin Mara (2005). For his performance in the film Vijay (1988), he won the Filmfare Award for Best Supporting Actor.

Besides working in Hindi films, he has also appeared in many acclaimed international films such as the Golden Globe nominated Bend It Like Beckham (2002), Ang Lee's Golden Lion–winning Lust, Caution (2007), and David O. Russell's Oscar-winning Silver Linings Playbook (2013). He received a BAFTA nomination for his supporting role in the British television sitcom The Boy With The Topknot (2018).

He has held the post of chairman of the Central Board of Film Certification and the National School of Drama in India. The Government of India honoured him with the Padma Shri in 2004 and the Padma Bhushan in 2016 for his contribution in the field of cinema and arts.

Civilian awards

 2004: Padma Shri by the Government of India for his contribution to Indian cinema
 2016: Padma Bhushan by the Government of India for his contribution to the arts

Film awards

Filmfare Awards

National Film Awards

British Academy Television Awards

Screen Actors Guild Awards

International Indian Film Academy Awards

Screen Awards India

Miscellaneous Awards

Other awards
 2000: Actor of the Decade Award (Millennium Honours)
 2000: Best Actor in a Comic Role at the Sansui Viewers Choice Awards
 2001: Real Life Hero Award at the Zee Gold Hindi Cinema Awards
 2005: "Divya Himachal Award" for excellence 2005, with the blessings of H.H. Dalai Lama
2013: Outstanding Achievement in Cinema award at The Asian Awards.
2015: Kalakar Award for The Actor of the Year in Kolkata

Recognitions
 He was honoured by Walk of the Stars as his hand print was preserved for posterity at Bandra Bandstand in Mumbai.
 He was presented with the “Honoured Guest” award by the US state of Texas for his contribution to cinema and art.

References

External links
 

Lists of awards received by Indian actor